Paul Henry Ginsparg (born January 1, 1955) is a physicist.  He developed the arXiv.org e-print archive.

Education
He is a graduate of Syosset High School in Syosset, New York.  He graduated from Harvard University with a Bachelor of Arts in physics and from Cornell University with a PhD in theoretical particle physics with a thesis titled Aspects of Symmetry Behavior in Quantum Field Theory.

Career in physics
Ginsparg was a junior fellow and taught in the physics department at Harvard University until 1990.
The pre-print archive was developed while he was a member of staff of Los Alamos National Laboratory, 1990–2001. Since 2001, Ginsparg has been a professor of Physics and Computing & Information Science at Cornell University.

He has published physics papers in the areas of quantum field theory, string theory, conformal field theory, and quantum gravity. He often comments on the changing world of physics in the Information Age.

Awards
He has been awarded the P.A.M. (Physics-Astronomy-Math) Award from the Special Libraries Association, named a Lingua Franca "Tech 20", elected as a Fellow of the American Physical Society, awarded a MacArthur Fellowship in 2002, received the Council of Science Editors Award for Meritorious Achievement, and received the Paul Evans Peters Award from Educause, ARL, and CNI.
He was a Radcliffe Institute Fellow in 2008–2009.
He was named a White House Champion of Change in June 2013. He was awarded with Einstein Foundation Award in 2021 for creating the arXiv.org.

Personal life
He has two children - a daughter, Miryam Ginsparg (b. 2000), and a son, Noam Ginsparg (b. 2004). His wife is Laura Jones, a mathematical biologist and researcher.

Publications
"Creating a global knowledge network", UNESCO Expert Conference on Electronic Publishing in Science, Paris, 19–23 February 2001, Second Joint ICSU Press
Fluctuating geometries in statistical mechanics and field theory, Editors François David, Paul Ginsparg, Jean Zinn-Justin, Elsevier, 1996, 
"First Steps toward Electronic Research Communication", Gateways to knowledge: the role of academic libraries in teaching, learning, and research, Editor Lawrence Dowler, MIT Press, 1997,

Notes

External links
eprints (co)-authored by Ginsparg at arXiv.org
"Paul Ginsparg", Berlin 6 Open Access Conference
Quick Study: Paul Ginsparg ’77, JF ’81, RI ’09

21st-century American physicists
Living people
MacArthur Fellows
Cornell University faculty
1955 births
Harvard College alumni
Cornell University alumni
Los Alamos National Laboratory personnel
People from Syosset, New York
Syosset High School alumni
Scientists from New York (state)
Fellows of the American Physical Society